Princesa de África is a 2008 documentary film.

Synopsis 
The story of two dreams. Marem, a 14-year-old dancer from Senegal, dreams of emigrating to Europe, while Sonia, a Spanish dancer, feels drawn by the magic of Africa. Both are linked by Pap Ndiaye, Marem's father and Sonia's husband. Africa isn't what Sonia had dreamt of (Pap Ndiaye has two additional wives), nor is Europe what Marem expected (there are no children in the street and poverty is also present). Princess of Africa is a love story, full of music and dance, where nothing is what it seems and women are the main characters.

Awards 
 Festival de Cine Europeo “Vinos de Castilla-La Mancha” de Solana 2008
 Extremadocs 2008
 Festival Alcances 2008

External links
 
 

2008 films
Spanish documentary films
2008 documentary films
Documentary films about dance
Documentary films about African music
2000s Spanish films